The 6th Secretariat of the Communist Party of Cuba (PCC) was elected in 2011 by the 1st Plenary Session of the 6th Central Committee in the immediate aftermath of the 6th Party Congress.

Officers

Members

Changes

References

Specific

Bibliography
Articles and journals:
 

6th Secretariat of the Communist Party of Cuba
2011 establishments in Cuba
2016 disestablishments in Cuba